The Marietta City School District is the school district which operates the public schools in Marietta, Georgia, United States.  It is the only city government  in Cobb County which operates its schools separately from the Cobb County School District.

Founded in 1892, classes began that year on Labor Day at four schools.  It now consists of one high school, a middle school, a sixth grade academy and several neighborhood elementary schools.

Board of Education

The following are the parts of the City Of Marietta Government Schools Department Board of Education 

Jeff DeJarnett (ward 1)
Jason Waters (Board Vice Chair and ward 2)
A.B. Almy (ward 3)
Jailene Hunter (ward 4)
Angela Orange (ward 5)
Kerry Minervini (Board Chair and ward 6)
Irene Berens (ward 7)

Schools

Elementary schools
 A.L. Burruss Elementary School
 Dunleith Elementary School
 Hickory Hills Elementary School
Lockheed Elementary School
 Marietta Center for Advanced Academics
 Park Street Elementary School
 Sawyer Road Elementary School
 West Side Elementary School

Middle schools
 Marietta Middle School (grades 7-8)
 Marietta Sixth-Grade Academy

High school
 Marietta High School
 College and Career Academy
 Woods Wilkins Campus
 Blended Learning Program
 Marietta Performance Learning Center
 Marietta Evening School
 Marietta Alternative Programs and Services (MAPS) program

Other Schools
Early Learning Center 
Emily Lembeck Early Learning Center

References

External links
 Marietta City School District

School districts in Georgia (U.S. state)
Education in Cobb County, Georgia
School districts established in 1892
1892 establishments in Georgia (U.S. state)